This is a list of accolades received by the 2004 movie Howl's Moving Castle, directed by Hayao Miyazaki.

Accolades

References

External links
 

Howl's Moving Castle